Cerro Deslinde is a  high volcano in Chile, just northeast of the El Tatio geothermal field.

South of Deslinde, a long glacier developed and spread westward.

References

External links

Stratovolcanoes of Chile
Deslinde
Pleistocene stratovolcanoes